Choanocotylidae is a family of trematodes belonging to the order Plagiorchiida.

Genera:
 Auriculotrema Platt, 2003

References

Plagiorchiida